Kranea, Krania or Crania is an Aromanian village and a community of the Grevena municipality. Before the 2011 local government reform it was a part of the municipality of Gorgiani, of which it was a municipal district. The 2011 census recorded 385 residents in the village. The community of Kranea covers an area of 70.929 km2.

According to the French traveller François Pouqueville, the settlement was formed in 1507 when the villages of Turia and Paleohori were merged.

See also
List of settlements in the Grevena regional unit

References

Populated places in Grevena (regional unit)
Aromanian settlements in Greece
Populated places established in 1507